Scythris barbatella is a moth of the family Scythrididae. It was described by Pierre Chrétien in 1915. It is found in Algeria and Tunisia.

References

barbatella
Moths described in 1915
Moths of Africa